This is a list of people who have ruled either the Margraviate of Austria, the Duchy of Austria or the Archduchy of Austria. From 976 until 1246, the margraviate and its successor, the duchy, was ruled by the House of Babenberg. At that time, those states were part of the Holy Roman Empire. From 1246 until 1918, the duchy and its successor, the archduchy, was ruled by the House of Habsburg. Following the defeat of Austria-Hungary in World War I, the titles were abolished or fell into abeyance with the erection of the modern Republic of Austria.

Margraves of Austria

The March of Austria, also known as Marcha Orientalis, was first formed in 976 out of the lands that had once been the March of Pannonia in Carolingian times. The oldest attestation dates back to 996, where the written name "ostarrichi" occurs in a document transferring land in present-day Austria to a Bavarian monastery.

House of Babenberg

|width=auto| Leopold I the Illustrious(Luitpold der Erlauchte)976–994
|  
| c. 940
| Richardis of Sualafeldgaunine children
| 10 July 994Würzburgaged about 54
|-
|width=auto| Henry I the Strong(Heinrich der Starke)994–1018 
|  
| late 10th centuryson of Leopold I and Richardis of Sualafeldgau
| never married
| 23 June 1018
|-
|width=auto| Adalbert I the Victorious(Adalbert der Siegreiche)1018–1055
|  
| c. 985son of Leopold I and Richardis of Sualafeldgau
| (1) Glismod of West-Saxonyno issue(2)Frozza Orseoloone issue
| 26 May 1055Melkaged about 70
|-
|width=auto| Ernest the Brave(Ernst der Tapfere)1055–1075
|  
| c. 1027son of Adalbert and Frozza Orseolo
| (1) Adelaide of Eilenburg1060three children(2) Swanhilde of Ungarnmark1072no issue
| 10 June 1075aged about 48
|-
|width=auto| Leopold II the Fair(Luitpold der Schöne)1075–1095
|  
| c. 1050son of Ernest and Adelaide of Eilenburg
| Ida of Cham1065eight children
| 12 October 1095aged about 45
|-
|width=auto| Leopold III the Good(Luitpold der Heilige)1095–1136
|  
| c. 1073Melkson of Leopold II and Ida of Cham
| (1) Maria of Pergno children(2) Agnes of Germany1106eighteen children
| 15 November 1136Viennaaged about 63
|-
|width=auto| Adalbert II the Devout(Adalbert der Andächtige)1136-1137
|  
| c. 1107son of Leopold III and Agnes of Germany
| (1) Adelaide of Polandno children(2) Hedwig of Hungary1132no children
| 9 November 1137Viennaaged about 30
|-
|width=auto| Leopold IV the Generous(Luitpold der Freigiebige)1137–1141
|  
| c. 1108son of Leopold III and Agnes of Germany
| Maria of Bohemia28 September 1138no issue
| 18 October 1141Niederalteichaged about 33
|-
|width=auto| Henry II Jasomirgott(Heinrich Jasomirgott)1141–1156
|  
| c. 1107son of Leopold III and Agnes of Germany
| (1) Gertrude of Süpplingenburg1 May 1142one daughter(2) Theodora Komnene1148three children 
| 13 January 1177aged about 70
|-
|}

Dukes of Austria

In 1156, the Privilegium Minus elevated the march to a duchy, independent of the Duchy of Bavaria.

House of Babenberg

|width=auto| Henry II Jasomirgott(Heinrich Jasomirgott)1156–1177
|  
| c. 1107son of Leopold III and Agnes of Germany
| (1) Gertrude of Süpplingenburg1 May 1142one daughter(2) Theodora Komnene1148three children 
| 13 January 1177aged about 70
|-
|width=auto| Leopold V the Virtuous(Luitpold der Tugendhafte)1177–1194
|  
| c. 1157son of Henry II and Theodora Komnene
| Helena of Hungary1174four children
| 31 December 1194Grazaged about 37
|-
|width=auto| Frederick I the Catholic(Friedrich der Katholische)1195–1198 
|  
| c. 1175son of Leopold V and Helena of Hungary
| never married
| 16 April 1198The Holy Landaged about 23
|-
|width=auto| Leopold VI the Glorious(Luitpold der Glorreiche)1198–1230 
|  
| c. 1176son of Leopold V and Helena of Hungary
| Theodora Angelina1203seven children
| 28 July 1230San Germanoaged about 54
|-
|width=auto| Frederick II the Quarrelsome(Friedrich der Streitbare)1230–1246 
|  
| 25 April 1211Wiener Neustadtson of Leopold VI and Theodora Angelina
| (1) Sophia Laskarinano issue(2) Agnes of Merania1229no issue
| 15 June 1246Leithaaged 35
|-
|}

Interregnum

After Frederick's death, the succession of the Duchy was disputed between various claimants, based in two main rival heiresses:
 Through Margaret of Austria, sister of Frederick II:
 Henry and Frederick of Hohenstaufen, sons, claimants 1246/50 – c.1252?
 Ottokar II of Bohemia, second husband, duke 1251–1276 (claimant up until 1278)
 Through Gertrude of Austria, niece of Frederick II:
Vladislaus, Margrave of Moravia (brother of Ottokar II), first husband, claimant 1246–1247
Herman of Baden, second husband, claimant 1248–1250
Roman Danylovich, third husband, claimant 1252–1253
Frederick I, Margrave of Baden, son, claimant c.1253–1268

Dukes and archdukes of Austria under the House of Habsburg

In 1278, King Rudolph I of Germany defeated Ottokar and took control of Austria. In 1282 he invested his sons with the duchies of Austria and Styria, thereby securing it for the House of Habsburg. Austria became one of the territories that remained under Habsburg rule for more than 600 years, forming the core of the Habsburg monarchy and the present-day country of Austria.

Partitions of Austria under Habsburg domain

Table of rulers

Emperors of Austria

|width=auto| Francis I11 August 1804 – 2 March 1835
|  
| 12 February 1768Florenceeldest son of Leopold VII and Maria Luisa of Spain
| (1) Elisabeth of Württemberg6 January 1788Viennaone daughter(2) Maria Theresa of Naples and Sicily15 September 1790Vienna12 children(3) Maria Ludovika of Austria-Este6 January 1808Viennano issue(4) Caroline Augusta of Bavaria29 October 1816Viennano issue
| 2 March 1835Viennaaged 67
|-
|width=auto| Ferdinand I2 March 1835 – 2 December 1848
|  
| 19 April 1793Viennaeldest son of Francis II and Maria Theresa of Naples and Sicily
| Maria Anna of Savoy27 February 1831 Viennano issue
| 29 June 1875Pragueaged 82
|-
|width=auto| Francis Joseph I2 December 1848 – 21 November 1916
|  
| 18 August 1830Schönbrunn Palaceeldest son of Archduke Franz Karl of Austria and Princess Sophie of Bavaria
| Elisabeth of Bavaria24 April 1854Augustinerkirchefour children
| 21 November 1916Schönbrunn Palaceaged 86
|-
|width=auto| Charles I21 November 1916 – 11 November 1918
| 
| 17 August 1887Persenbeug-Gottsdorfeldest son of Archduke Otto Francis of Austria and Princess Maria Josepha of Saxony
| Zita of Bourbon-Parma21 October 1911Schwarzau Castleeight children
| 1 April 1922Madeiraaged 34
|-
|}

Republic of Austria

In 1918, following the breakup of the Austro-Hungarian Monarchy, the Republic of Austria was established, but ended with "Anschluß" into the Third Reich from 1938 to 1945. Following World War II, the current Republic of Austria was established in 1945, even though Austria remained under the control and protection of Allied and Soviet Forces between 1945 and 1955.

The current head of state is the President of Austria; however, in practice, the Chancellor of Austria is more important. Every law still needs to be signed by the President.

Otto von Habsburg (1912–2011), son of Charles I, was the head of the Habsburg house from 1922, but never reigned. In 2007 he handed the headship to his oldest son Karl von Habsburg who was first in the line of succession. He is the current head of the imperial family.

See also
 Austrian nobility
 History of Austria
 Pragmatic Sanction of 1713
 List of Austrian consorts
 List of heirs to the Austrian throne
 List of presidents of Austria
 List of chancellors of Austria

References 

Austria history-related lists
Austria

it:Sovrani d'Austria